Shetye is a (Marathi: शेटये) Indian Hindu surname, typically found in Western India.

Surname
 Satish Ramnath Shetye (born 1950), is an Indian geophysicist, oceanographer and a former vice chancellor of the University of Goa.
 Poorva Shetye (born 1993), is an Indian International Swimmer, who is specialized in 50 m, 100 m and 200 m breaststroke.
 Sadanand Shetye, is an Indian Kabaddi player belonging to the state of Maharashtra.

See also
 Marathi people
 Konkani people

References

Marathi-language surnames
Indian surnames